Northern Peripheral Road or NH 248-BB,  commonly known as Dwarka Expressway is a  long, under construction, 8-lane,elevated grade separated expressway connecting Dwarka in Delhi to Kherki Daula Toll Plaza, Gurgaon in Haryana. The expressway will take off from km 20 of NH 48 (old NH 8) at Shiv Murti in Mahipalpur in Delhi and terminate at km 40 of NH 48 near Kherki Daula Toll Plaza in Gurgaon in Haryana. The NPR has been planned as an alternate road link between Delhi and Gurgaon, and is expected to ease the traffic situation on the Delhi-Gurgaon Expressway.

Entire project, costing ₹7,500 crore was planned in 2006, contract was awarded in 2011. Of the original 18 km project, 14 km were completed by 2016. Several more kilometre project routes was added to the scope of the project as an extension. Various parts of the project remained delayed due to land acquisition and tree transplantation hurdles, resulting in the intervention from the Prime Minister's office in November 2018 to resolve the pending issues. Subsequently, the land for the 10 km section was handed by the Haryana and Delhi, AAI and HSVP were in the process of expediting the resolution in December 2018.

One of the cause of delay was due to NHAI's need for the land from DDA to transplant 13,000 trees from the route alignment, which in November 2018 Delhi's Chief Minister Arvind Kejriwal agreed to provide after several years of inexplicable delays. 

In December, Haryana too handed over the land for 10 km route to NHAI and was in process of handing over the remaining land for the 4 km route by 31 December 2018. Earlier in January 2018, AAI too had agreed to sell their land to NHAI for the route falling on their land. Put together all of this takes care of the land needed for the entire route from various parties i.e. AAI, DDA and HSVP.

History 
The Northern Peripheral Road was envisaged as an alternate route for connecting Dwarka and Gurgaon in 2006. It would have been 18 km long, signal-free road, with 14 km in Gurgaon and rest in Delhi. A 3.2 km long Central Peripheral Road (CPR) was planned to connect it to Southern Peripheral Road (SPR) at Kherki Daula on NH-48. Land acquisition started in 2007-08. The construction contract was given to JSR Construction Private Ltd and India Bulls Private Ltd in April 2011 and the completion date was set to be 31 March 2012. The Punjab and Haryana High Court disposed of the petitions in May 2015. In June 2016, the project was acquired by National Highways Authority of India and road was renamed National Highway 248-BB. By that time, 14 km stretch of the expressway with six lanes had been completed. The scope of the project was expanded and the proposed Central Peripheral Road (CPR) and 6.3 km long section of  Urban Extension Road-II (UER II) were included as part of the expressway. But construction couldn't be started immediately as HUDA was not able to hand over land to NHAI due to the matter of allotment of alternate plots to oustees being heard in Punjab and Haryana High Court. On 28 May 2018, the High Court directed HUDA to allot alternate houses to 72 oustees, holding General Power of Attorney or Special Power of Attorney, within two weeks and thus allowing the authority to demolish remaining houses and hand over the land to NHAI.

Route and construction 
This 29 km long project, 18.9 in Gurugram and 10.1 km in Delhi, is expected to be completed by May 2023. Work on Haryana portion can commence as of Dec 2018. Delhi has provided the land but yet to provide the forests clearance as of December 2018. Route alignment and phases/packages of this expressway being built by NHAI are as follows:

 Package 1 - in Delhi: Mahipalpur Shiv Murti cloverleaf interchange to Bijwasan railway station underpass: This stretch will be 5.3 km long starting from Shiv Murti at NH-8 (old numbering, now called NH48) and ending at the approach of the Rail under Bridge near Sector 21, Dwarka. 3.5 km of this will be a deep tunnel running under the runway, which will cost INR1000 crore. Status in May 2018 - tendering: Tender will be awarded by December 2018 with target completion date of May 2021.
 Package 2 - in Delhi: Bijwasan rail underpass to Delhi-Haryana Border: This 4.2 km long stretch will be between Km 5.3 at the Rail under Bridge and Km 9.5 at the Delhi Haryana border on the expressway.
 Package 3 - in Gurugram: Delhi-Haryana Border to approach of Basai railway overbridge: This stretch will be 10.2 km long between Km 9.5 to Km 19.5 of the expressway. The road will pass through Sectors 102, 103, 104, 105, 106, 109, 110, 111, 112 and 113 in Gurugram. Since this section has continuous intersection of sector roads, most of the stretch will be constructed as elevated dual carriageway of 4 lanes each. The service roads will run beneath the main carriageway and will be elevated at all major junctions. The crossroads will also be depressed with underpasses at all major junctions. It will cost INR 1,333 crore and tenders have been awarded already.
 Package 4 - in Gurugram: Basai rail overbridge to Kherki Daula Toll Plaza: This 8.77 km stretch will start from Rail over Bridge at Basai and end at a cloverleaf interchange near Kherki Daula at Km 40 of the NH-48, thus including the route originally planned for the CPR. As per NHAI website, this eight-lane Expressway (NH-248 BB) will be constructed on EPC Mode at a cost of ₹1,047.007 crore. The 8.76  km stretch will be constructed by M/s Larsen and Toubro Ltd. The project consists of an 8-lane elevated structure for the main carriageway of Dwarka Expressway, Trumpet Interchange for Manesar Road and Cloverleaf interchange with NH-8-SPR intersection. The completion period of the project is two years (mid-year 2020) with a maintenance period of four years. Under the project, a minor bridge will be widened, additional ROBs, five VUP, six Bus Bays with Bus Shelter will be erected and four Junction Improvements will be carried out. Status: Construction commenced in December 2018 after the entire land (9- metre wide and 10.2 km long) was handed over to NHAI by the HSVP in December.
 Package 5 - in Delhi: Dwarka Expressway (Mahipalpur Shiv Murti) to IGI Airport T3 Tunnel (also called Delhi Airport Tunnel Expressway): An east-to-west running new 4-lane shallow 1.5 km tunnel costing INR350 crore being built from north-to-south as part of Dwarka Expressway to Terminal 3 of Indira Gandhi International Airport . Vasant Kunj, IIT, Munirka and Mehrauli. It will benefit commuters from the Vasant Kunj, IIT Delhi, Munirka and Mehrauli. Status in Jan 2018 - land sale agreed: AAI agreed to sell the required land to NHAI at market price. In April 2018, NHAI announced they will award the contact in May 2018 which will be completed within 3 years i.e. May 2021.

Route alignment
The route alignment to the west of Gurgaon is as follows:

 In Delhi
 Mahipalpur, commences at Shiv Murti on 20 km milestone of NH 48 
 Along Indira Gandhi International Airport southern perimeter
 Under Delhi-Rewari railway line near new terminus of Bijwasan railway station
 Dwarka Sectors 21, 22, 25, 27, 28
 Najafgarh-Bijwasan Road 
 In Haryana
 Bajghera village in Gurgaon
 Road bridge over Delhi-Rewari railway line at Sectors 99 x 37D in Gurgaon
 National Highway 352W (Pataudi Road) near Harsaru in Gurgaon
 Kherki Daula Toll Plaza, terminates here to Delhi Mumbai Expressway and Southern Peripheral Road (Ghata-Kherki Daula 16  km route to east of Gurugram)

Status updates
 March 2019: Foundation stone laid by Union Minister Nitin Gadkari on 08-March-2019. The ₹9,500 crore expressway will be 29 km long. Most of the construction contracts are already awarded and construction is expected to begin soon.
 August 2019: Package 2 of Dwarka Expressway has been approved by the Delhi Government and the preparatory work on package 2 has started and the contractor is setting up a camp at the site.
February 2021: More than half of the construction work is completed. Remaining  stretch till Gurugram is expected to be completed by August 2021.
March 2021: Expressway expected to be completed by August 2022.
September 2021: The cloverleaf section of the expressway is expected to be completed by September 2022.
June 2022: Expressway expected to be completed by early 2023.

See also
 Expressways in India
 Expressways & highways in Haryana
 Eastern Peripheral Expressway (KGP)
 Western Peripheral Expressway (KMP)
 Delhi–Mumbai Expressway
 Delhi-Amritsar-Katra Expressway
 Delhi–Gurgaon Expressway
 Delhi–Faridabad Skyway
 DND Flyway

References 

Expressways in Delhi
Transport in Gurgaon
Transport in Delhi
Expressways in Haryana